Újezd u Brna is a town in Brno-Country District in the South Bohemian Region of the Czech Republic. It has about 3,300 inhabitants.

Geography
It lies in the Dyje–Svratka Valley.

History
The first written mention of Újezd (under the name Újezdec) is in a deed of Jindřich Zdík from 1141.

Újezd was part of the battlefield of the Battle of Austerlitz on 2 December 1805.

In 1909, Újezd was promoted to a market town. In 1952, Újezd merged with neighbouring villages of Rychmanov and Šternov and was renamed Újezd u Brna. In 2005, Újezd u Brna became a town.

Notable people
Jaroslav Konečný (1945–2017), handball player; lived and died here

References

External links

 

Cities and towns in the Czech Republic
Populated places in Brno-Country District